Friedrich Albert Lange (28 September 1828 – 21 November 1875) was a German philosopher and sociologist.

Biography

Lange was born in Wald, near Solingen, the son of the theologian, Johann Peter Lange. He was educated at Duisburg, Zürich and Bonn, where he distinguished himself in gymnastics as much as academically. In 1852 he became a schoolmaster at Cologne; in 1853 Privatdozent in philosophy at Bonn; and in 1858 schoolmaster at Duisburg, resigning when the government forbade schoolmasters to take part in political activities.

Lange entered journalism as editor of the Rhein- und Ruhr-Zeitung in 1862 in the cause of political and social reform. His ceterum censeo can be considered to be the repeated demand for Bismarck's resignation. He was prominent in public affairs, yet found enough time to write most of his best-known books, Die Leibesübungen (1863), Die Arbeiterfrage (1865, 5th ed. 1894), Geschichte des Materialismus (1866), and John Stuart Mills Ansichten über die soziale Frage (1866). He also wrote a number of works on pedagogy and psychology. In 1863, Lange supported the socialist leader Ferdinand Lassalle in an important trial concerning the constitutional guarantee of academic freedom. From 1864 to 1866, Lange was a member of the executive committee of the Association of German Labour Unions (Verband Deutscher Arbeitervereine), an early organisation of the German labour movement. One of his colleagues there was August Bebel, the Social-Democratic leader who wrote of him that "he had a short and strong figure, and was of a sympathetic presence. He had magnificent eyes, and was one of the most amiable men whom I have ever known. He won the hearts of people at first sight" while also describing him as of "firm character".

In 1866, discouraged by affairs in Germany, he moved to Winterthur, near Zürich, to become connected with the democratic newspaper, Winterthurer Landbote. In 1869 he was Privatdozent at Zürich, and the next year he was appointed professor of inductive philosophy, a new position. He was also engaged in the Swiss Democratic movement and helped write the constitution of the Canton of Zurich. This was distinguished by the use of  "direct democratic"  measures such as referendum and recall. Still in Zürich he recognized first signs of his illness, which led several years later to his death. The strong French sympathies of the Swiss in the Franco-Prussian War as well as the prospect for a pension for his wife in the case of his death led to his speedy resignation. He had an offer from the universities of Würzburg, Königsberg, Kiel, Gießen and Jena, but in 1872 he accepted a professorship at the University of Marburg. He is sometimes credited with founding the Marburg School of neo-Kantianism, along with his star pupil, Hermann Cohen. It was Cohen, however, who pioneered the Marburg School's characteristic logicist interpretation of Kantian philosophy. In later years, Lange accepted Cohen's refutation of a psychological interpretation of the a priori, to which he himself had once subscribed.

Although he rejected Marxist materialism, Lange continued to influence the German Social-Democratic movement. He favoured an ethically motivated, reformist socialism. He especially influenced some leaders of the Lassallean General German Workers' Union and, posthumously, the Revisionist theoretician Eduard Bernstein, whose slogan "Kant, not cant" proclaimed his abandonment of Marxian "scientific socialism" in favour of a neo-Kantian, ethically based social reformism. Subsequent leaders of the Marburg School, such as Cohen and Natorp, continued this association with the reformist wing of the SPD. Unhappily, his body was already stricken with disease. He no longer played a role in the unification of the Lassalleans with Bebel's socialists into the unified SPD in May 1875. After a lingering illness, probably gastro-intestinal cancer, he died in Marburg in November of that year. His Logische Studien (Logical Studies) were published by Hermann Cohen in 1877. Lange also wrote a number of literary studies which were published posthumously. His main work, the Geschichte des Materialismus is a didactic exposition of principles rather than a history in the proper sense. According to Lange, to think clearly about materialism is to refute it.

There is a comprehensive school named after him, the Friedrich-Albert-Lange-Gesamtschule, in Wald, his birthplace, which is now part of the city of Solingen.

Overview of his philosophy
Adopting the Kantian standpoint that we can know nothing but phenomena, Lange maintained that neither materialism nor any other metaphysical system has a valid claim to ultimate truth. For empirical phenomenal knowledge, however, which is all that we can look for, materialism with its exact scientific methods has done most valuable service. Ideal metaphysics, though they fail of the inner truth of things, have a value as the embodiment of high aspirations, in the same way as poetry and religion. In Lange's Logische Studien, which attempts a reconstruction of formal logic, the leading idea is that reasoning has validity in so far as it can be represented in terms of space. His Arbeiterfrage advocates an ill-defined form of socialism. It protests against contemporary industrial selfishness, and against the organization of industry on the Darwinian principle of struggle for existence.

Works

 1855: Über den Zusammenhang der Erziehungssysteme mit den herrschenden Weltanschauungen verschiedener Zeitalter. (On the Connection Between the Educational Systems with the Dominant World Views of Different Eras.)
 1862: Die Stellung der Schule zum öffentlichen Leben. (The Position of the School in Relation to Public Life.)
 1863: Die Leibesübungen. Eine Darstellung des Werdens und Wesens der Turnkunst in ihrer pädagogischen und culturhistorischen Bedeutung. (Physical Exercise: A Presentation of the History and Essence of Gymnastics in its Pedagogical and Cultural-Historical Significance.)
 1865: Die Arbeiterfrage in ihrer Bedeutung für Gegenwart und Zukunft. (The Labour Question in its Present and Future Significance.)
 1865: Die Grundlegung der mathematischen Psychologie. Ein Versuch zur Nachweisung des fundamentalen Fehlers bei Herbart und Drobisch. (Foundations of Mathematical Psychology. Attempt at a Demonstration of the Fundamental Error of Herbart and Drobisch.)
 1866: Geschichte des Materialismus und Kritik seiner Bedeutung in der Gegenwart. (History of Materialism and Critique of its Present Significance.)
 1877: Logische Studien. Ein Beitrag zur Neubegründung der formalen Logik und der Erkenntnisstheorie. (Logical Studies. A Contribution to the New Foundation of Formal Logic and Cognitive Theory.)

Notes

References
A comprehensive bibliography of Lange's own works, as well as some of the secondary literature, can be found online at: http://philpapers.org/sep/friedrich-lange/.

Further reading
 Bleuler-Hausheer, Salomon (1876), "Friedrich Albert Lange. Eine biographische Skizze und Erinnerungen an die Verfassungsrevision", in: Der Landbote und Tagblatt der Stadt Winterthur, No. 2, 2. Januar 1876 bis No. 11, 13. Januar 1876
 Berdiajew, Nikolai, "Friedrich Albert Lange und die kritische Philosophie in ihren Beziehungen zum Sozialismus", in: Die Neue Zeit, 18. Jg., (1900), 2. Bd., S. 132-140, S. 164-174, S. 196-207
 Bernstein, Eduart, "Zur Würdigung Friedrich Albert Langes", in: Die Neue Zeit. Revue des geistigen und öffentlichen Lebens, 6. Jg., (1892), 2. Bd., S. 68-78, 101-109, 132-141
 Braun, Heinrich (1881), Friedrich Albert Lange als Sozialökonom nach seinem Leben und seinen Schriften, Diss. Universität Halle a.d.Saale
 Cohen, Hermann, "Friedrich Albert Lange", in: Treitschke, H.v./Wehrenpfennig, W. (Hrsg.), Preußische Jahrbücher, 37. Band, (1876), 4. Heft, S. 353-381
 Georg Eckert, "Friedrich Albert Lange (1828-1875) und die Social-Demokratie in Duisburg", in: Duisburger Forschungen 8 (1965), 1-23
 ders., Friedrich Albert Lange. Über Politik und Philosophie. Briefe und Leitartikel 1862-1875 (= Duisburger Forschungen Beiheft 10); Duisburg 1968
 Elissen, Otto A. (1894), Friedrich Albert Lange. Eine Lebensbeschreibung, Leipzig
 Fischer, Heinz-Dietrich, "F. A. Lange als politischer Publizist", in: Duisburger Forschungen 21 (1975), 145-173
 Freimuth, Frank (1993), Wie kultiviere ich die Freiheit bei dem Zwange? Das Bildungsverständnis Friedrich Albert Langes, Pfaffenweiler
 Grab, Walter, "F. A. Langes Zeitung »Der Bote vom Niederrhein« und die Kontinuität demokratischer Strömungen in Deutschland", in: Duisburger Forschungen 21 (1975), 83-91
 Gross, Andreas / Klages, Andreas (1996), "Die Volksinitiative in den Kantonen am Beispiel des Kantons Zürich", in: Auer, A. (Hrsg.), Les origines de la démocratie directe en Suisse / Die Ursprünge der schweizerischen direkten Demokratie. Actes du Colloque organisé les 27-29 avril 1995 par la Faculté de droit et le C2D, Bern, S. 267-281
 Guggenbühl, Gottfried (1936), Der Landbote 1836-1936. Hundert Jahre Politik im Spiegel der Presse, Winterthur
 Gundlach, Franz (1928), Catalogus Professorumm Academiae Marburgensis. Die akademischen Lehrer der Philipps-Universität Marburg. Von 1527-1910, S. 298.
 Heid, Ludger, "F. A. Lange und der Preußische Verfassungskonflikt", in: Duisburger Forschungen 21 (1975), 56-70
 Heinemann, Gustav (1978), "Friedrich Albert Lange - Der Vorrang der politischen vor der sozialen", in: Frankfurter Hefte. Zeitschrift für Kultur und Politik, 33. Jg., Heft 2, Februar, S. 27-33.
 Hirsch, Helmut, "F. A. Lange und die USA im Zeitpunkt des amerikanischen Sezessionskrieges", in: Duisburger Forschungen 21 (1975), 92-107
 Holzhey, Helmut, "Philosophische Kritik. Zum Verhältnis von Erkenntnistheorie und Sozialphilosophie bei F.A. Lange", in: Duisburger Forschungen 21 (1975), 207-225
 Irmer, Peter,  F.A. Lange – ein politischer Agitator in der deutschen Arbeiterbewegung; in: Duisburger Forschungen 21 (1975), 1-19
 Jacobsen, Bjarne (1989), Max Weber und Friedrich Albert Lange. Rezeption und Innovation, Wiesbaden
  (with references)
 Knoll, Joachim H., F.A. Lange - eine »merkwürdige Randfigur« in der Pädagogik des 19. Jahrhunderts; in: Duisburger Forschungen 21 (1975), 108-132
 Ley, Hermann, F.A. Langes „Geschichte des Materialismus"; in: Duisburger Forschungen 21 (1975), 174-187
 Majert, Regina, Friedrich Albert Lange als Präses des Vorstandes der gewerblichen Sonntagsschule in Duisburg (1860-1865); in: Duisburger Forschungen 23 (1976), 238-248
  Na’aman, Shlomo, F.A. Lange in der deutschen Arbeiterbewegung; in: Duisburger Forschungen 21 (1975), 20-55
 Plump, Klaus, "Der Nachlaß F.A. Langes im Stadtarchiv Duisburg"; in: Duisburger Forschungen 21 (1975), 236-267
 ders. (1975), "Versuch einer Bibliographie der von Friedrich Albert Lange publizierten Schriften", in: Knoll, Joachim/ Schoeps, Uulius (Hrsg.), Friedrich Albert Lange. Leben und Werk, Duisburg, S. 236-265
 Reichesberg, Naum (1892), Friedrich Albert Lange als Sozialökonom, Dissertation Universität Bern
 Sass, Hans-Martin, Der Standpunkt des Ideals als kritische Überwindung materialistischer und idealistischer Metaphysik; in: Duisburger Forschungen 21 (1975), 188-206
 Sattler, Martin, "F. A. Lange:  »Socialkonservativer« oder »Socialrevolutionär«"; in: Duisburger Forschungen 21 (1975), 71-82
 Schoeps, Julius H., "F. A. Lange und die deutsche Turnbewegung", in: Duisburger Forschungen 21 (1975), 133-145
 Schulz, Eberhard Günter (1991), Friedrich Albert Lange und die katholische Philosophie, Bochum
 Stack, Georg J. (1983), Nietzsche and Lange, Berlin, New York
 Vaihinger, Hans (1876), Hartmann, Dürig und Lange. Zur Geschichte der deutschen Philosophie im 19. Jahrhundert, Iserlohn
 Weyer, Adam, "Religion und Sozialismus bei F. A. Lange", in: Duisburger Forschungen 21 (1975), 226-235
 Wolff, Georg (1925), Friedrich Albert Langes sozialpolitische Anschauungen und seine Stellung zu Sozialismus und Sozialreform, Dissertation Universität Gießen
 Zinnel, Jürgen (2000), Friedrich Albert Langes Überlegungen zur direkten Demokratie unter Berücksichtigung zeitgenössischer Diskussionszusammenhänge, Marburg

External links
 Friedrich Albert Lange entry at the Stanford Encyclopedia of Philosophy by Nadeem J. Z. Hussain
 Biography and text of Geschichte des Materialismus at Zeno.org 
 History of Materialism, Vol. I (English)
 History of Materialism, Vol. 2 (English)
 History of Materialism, Vol. 3 (English)

Kantian philosophers
German philosophers
19th-century philosophers
19th-century German people
German socialists
People from Solingen
People from the Rhine Province
1828 births
1875 deaths
19th-century German writers
19th-century German male writers